The Algésiras was an 80-gun Bucentaure-class 80-gun ship of the line of the French Navy, designed by Sané.

She took part in the Invasion of Algiers in 1830, under Captain Ponée, and in the Battle of the Tagus the next year, under Captain Moulac.

In 1832, she was used as a troopship to ferry troops to Algeria. In 1836, she cruised the Caribbean with Artémise.

Algésiras was featured in Les Misérables, where she is mislabeled as a frigate:

References
 Jean-Michel Roche, Dictionnaire des Bâtiments de la flotte de guerre française de Colbert à nos jours, tome I

Ships of the line of the French Navy
Ships built in France
Bucentaure-class ships of the line
1823 ships